Habibollahi Expressway is an expressway in Iran.  It is located in western Isfahan connecting Mirza Kouchak Khan Expressway and Shahid Meysami Expressway.

Notes

Streets in Isfahan